Temiar may refer to:
Temiar people
Temiar language